XHSA-FM is a radio station on 100.9 FM in Saltillo, Coahuila. The station carries a grupera format known as La Reina.

History
XHSA received its concession on May 31, 1990. It was owned by Radio Signo, S.A., a subsidiary of Radiorama.

References

Radio stations in Coahuila
Radio stations established in 1990
Mass media in Saltillo